Serena Williams was the defending champion, but did not compete this year.

Venus Williams won the title by defeating Monica Seles 6–0, 6–7(3–7), 6–3 in the final. It was the 3rd title for Williams in the season and the 12th title in her career.

Seeds
The first four seeds received a bye into the second round.

Draw

Finals

Top half

Bottom half

External links
 WTA tournament draws

Southern California Open
2000 WTA Tour